Hendro Scholtz (born Bethlehem, Free State, 22 March 1979) is a former South African rugby union player and currently the head coach at Varsity Cup side .

Career

He was first included in the  squad in 1999 and remained at the team until 2010. This also culminated in a call-up to the Springboks and he was included in the team for the 2003 Rugby World Cup.

He was a surprise call-up to the  team in 2012, coming out of semi-retirement to represent them in the 2012 Currie Cup Premier Division.

References

South African rugby union players
Living people
1979 births
Bulls (rugby union) players
Cheetahs (rugby union) players
Free State Cheetahs players
Lions (United Rugby Championship) players
Rugby union flankers
People from Bethlehem, Free State
South Africa international rugby union players
University of the Free State alumni
South African expatriate rugby union players
Expatriate rugby union players in France
Expatriate rugby union players in Italy
South African expatriate sportspeople in France
South African expatriate sportspeople in Italy
SU Agen Lot-et-Garonne players
Rugby Rovigo Delta players
Rugby union players from the Free State (province)